The 1942–1943 SM-sarja season of the Finnish Elite League(SM-sarja) took place even though the Continuation War continued on. The season featured 8 teams from 4 cities. Teams played 7 games each.

SM-sarja championship 

KIF Wins the 1942–1943 SM-sarja championship.

References
 Hockey Archives

Liiga seasons
Fin
1942–43 in Finnish ice hockey